Spiculosis is a rare congenital skin condition found in young male Kerry Blue Terriers.  It could also occur in older females of the species. The condition is characterized by hyperkeratosis of individual hair follicles which leads to the creation of abnormally-thickened and spiked hairs, known as spicules. These can be painful but groomers are usually equipped to remove them or even pet owners by just soaking the dog in warm water and Epsom salts. In a case where the spicules become infected, additional treatment is sometimes necessary. Most cases have responded to dietary retinoid supplementation such as acitretin or etretinate. in severe cases, isotretinoin is prescribed. In less common cases, reports have been received of acral lick dermatitis and acral lick granuloma have been reported.

References 

Dog diseases
Veterinary diagnosis